In molecular biology, Domain B5 is found in phenylalanine-tRNA synthetase beta subunits. This domain has been shown to bind DNA through a winged helix-turn-helix motif. Phenylalanine-tRNA synthetase may influence common cellular processes via DNA binding, in addition to its aminoacylation function.

Function
The beta domain, in particular, B3/B4, is required for the correct amino acid to be joined to the corresponding tRNA. Hence, the B3/B4 domain is crucial to accurate translation. Failure to do so, results in a mutated protein which improperly folds and consequently protein function is affected.
/B

References

Protein domains